The 1996 Direct Line International Championships was a women's tennis tournament played on grass courts at the Devonshire Park Lawn Tennis Club in Eastbourne in the United Kingdom that was part of Tier II of the 1996 WTA Tour. It was the 22nd edition of the tournament and was held from 18 June until 22 June 1996. First-seeded Monica Seles won the singles title.

Finals

Singles

 Monica Seles'defeated  Mary Joe Fernández 6–0, 6–2
 It was Seles' 3rd singles title of the year and the 36th of her career.

Doubles

 Jana Novotná /  Arantxa Sánchez Vicario defeated  Rosalyn Nideffer /  Pam Shriver 4–6, 7–5, 6–4
 It was Novotná's 5th doubles title of the year and the 61st of her career. It was Sánchez Vicario's 8th doubles title of the year and the 48th of her career.

References

External links
 ITF tournament edition details

Direct Line International Championships
Eastbourne International
Direct Line International Championships
Direct Line International Championships
1996 in English tennis